Giacinto Camillo Maradei (1 March 1636 – 2 September 1705) was a Roman Catholic prelate who served as Bishop of Policastro (1696–1705).

Biography
Maradei was born in Laino Castello, Italy on 1 March 1636 and ordained a priest on 25 February 1668. On 2 April 1696, he was appointed by Pope Innocent XII as Bishop of Policastro. On 8 April 1696, he was consecrated bishop by Ferdinando d'Adda, Cardinal-Priest of Santa Balbina, with Carlo Loffredo, Archbishop of Bari (-Canosa), and Domenico Diez de Aux, Bishop of Gerace, serving as co-consecrators. He served as Bishop of Policastro until his death on 2 September 1705. While bishop, he was the principal co-consecrator of Emanuele Cicatelli, Bishop of Avellino e Frigento (1700), and Nicolò Cervini, Bishop of Lavello (1700).

References 

1636 births
1705 deaths
17th-century Italian Roman Catholic bishops
18th-century Italian Roman Catholic bishops
Bishops appointed by Pope Innocent XII